Loop Head, is a headland on the north side of the mouth of the River Shannon, in County Clare in the west of Ireland.

Loop Head is marked by a prominent lighthouse. The opposite headland on the south side of the Shannon is Kerry Head. The Shannon Foynes Port Company controls navigation in the Shannon estuary and river.

Loop Head peninsula, has the Atlantic Ocean on one side and the Shannon Estuary on the other, with barely a mile of land saving it from island status.

In 2010, the Loop Head peninsula was awarded a European Destinations of Excellence Award, which is an EU accolade for emerging tourism destinations which are developing in a responsible and sustainable manner. In 2013, Loop Head was named the "Best Place to Holiday in Ireland" by The Irish Times, and was shortlisted in the Best Destination category at the World Responsible Tourism awards. The Loop Head Peninsula is the only Irish destination listed in the 2014 Global Sustainable Top 100 Destinations and in 2015 took the gold medal at the Irish Responsible Tourism Awards.

Part of the film Star Wars: The Last Jedi was filmed at Loop Head.

The head has a giant "Eire" sign left over from World War II during The Emergency in Ireland.

Gallery

See also

 List of lighthouses in Ireland

References

External links

Awarded "EDEN - European Destinations of Excellence" non traditional tourist destination 2010
Commissioners of Irish Lights

Headlands of County Clare
Lighthouses in the Republic of Ireland
Lighthouses on the National Inventory of Architectural Heritage